"Muévelo" ("Move It") is a song by American singer Nicky Jam, and Puerto Rican rapper Daddy Yankee. It was released as the second single from Bad Boys for Life soundtrack. Produced by Play-N-Skillz, Scott Summers Wally The Mind Writer and Daddy Yankee, the song samples Ini Kamoze's "Here Comes the Hotstepper".

Charts

Weekly charts

Year-end charts

Certifications

See also
List of Billboard number-one Latin songs of 2020

References

2020 singles
Nicky Jam songs
Daddy Yankee songs
Epic Records singles
Songs written by Nicky Jam
Songs written by Salaam Remi
Songs written by Chris Kenner
Songs written by Daddy Yankee
Song recordings produced by Play-N-Skillz
Spanish-language songs
Bad Boys (franchise)
Songs written by Francisco Saldaña